Illinois Route 164 is a state road in rural western Illinois. It runs from U.S. Route 34 in Gladstone to U.S. Route 34 and Illinois Route 41 in Galesburg.

Route description 

Illinois 164 is the main access road from Monmouth (the county seat of Warren County) to Oquawka (the county seat of Henderson County). It is a rural, two-lane road for its entire length. From Gladstone to Oquawka the route runs north–south; at Oquawka Illinois 164 turns east.

History 
In 1924, SBI Route 164 was originally the route from Pekin to west of Bloomington, now part of Illinois Route 9.

In 1937, IL 164 was assigned to the road that had been IL 94A from Monmouth to Gladstone. 

This route still exists today in Warren and Henderson Counties.  The route was extended in the late 1990s along the old U.S. 34 alignment between Monmouth and Galesburg, after completion of the 4-lane freeway upgrade of US 34 in this section.  The current eastern terminus is U.S. 150 at corner of Henderson and Main Streets in Galesburg.  This was the historic northern terminus of IL 41.

Major intersections

References

External links 

164
U.S. Route 34
Transportation in Henderson County, Illinois
Transportation in Warren County, Illinois
Transportation in Knox County, Illinois